Andi Rianto (born May 7, 1972) is a noted Indonesian film score composer who has worked on several of Indonesia's most popular films. He's also the leader of Magenta Orchestra.

In 2002 he worked on Ca-bau-kan and in 2003 he composed for Arisan!. Additionally, in 2009 he worked on the new theme of Seputar Indonesia, the flagship news program on RCTI. Graduated in Berklee College of Music, and become a leader for a band called Magenta Orchestra.

He started with piano lesson at 4 year old. In 1990, when he was at Senior High School, his family moved to US, and he enrolled to Forest Hills High School in New York. His teachers advised him to continue his education after graduation from high school in music at Berklee.

In 1992 he passed to enter the Berklee College of Music in Boston Massachusetts USA, and he took specialization in composition and arrangement. In 1996 he graduated from Berklee with hold an Cum Laude  grade.

In 1998 he returned to Indonesia, then he established the Magenta Orchestra and the Deluxe Symphony in Jakarta.

Filmography 
Titik hitam (2002)
Biarkan bintang menari (2003)
Arisan! (2003)
30 hari mencari cinta (2004)
Mengejar matahari (2004)
Vina bilang cinta (2005)
9 Naga (2006)
Jatuh cinta lagi (2006)
Mendadak Dangdut (2006)
Kuntilanak (2006)
Pesan dari surga (2006)
Pocong 2 (2006)
Kangen (2007)
Pocong 3 (2007)
Kuntilanak 2 (2007) (post-production)

External links and sources

References

Indonesian film score composers
Living people
Anugerah Musik Indonesia winners
Berklee College of Music alumni
1972 births